Joseph Julián González is an American composer based in Los Angeles, California. Working primarily as a composer for television and film, he also composes for live orchestra and choir performance.

Education
Born and raised in Bakersfield, California, the son of former farm worker parents, González began his musical education at California State University, Bakersfield, where he studied under Dr. Doug Davis, professor of composition and director of CSUB's Jazz Ensemble. Davis encouraged González to apply for a scholarship to the University of California, Los Angeles, to complete his undergraduate degree, where he majored in classical guitar performance and composition for motion picture. While at UCLA, González studied under David Raksin. He has also studied under Elaine Barkin, Roger Bourland, John Adams, Osvaldo Golijov, and Thomas Newman.

Career

Early career
After finishing his education at UCLA, González toured with the New Christy Minstrels, and then became music director for Luis Valdez' El Teatro Campesino.

Film and television
González' first televised composition was the PBS broadcast of La Pastorela as part of its Great Performances program. La Pastorela was initially a production of El Teatro Campesino, a Christmas pageant set in a Tex-Mex milieu, featuring Linda Ronstadt, Lupe Ontiveros, Paul Rodriguez and Cheech Marin. Since then, González' compositions have been featured in over 200 films, documentaries, and television programs. Some of the most prominent of his compositions for film and television include Quentin Tarantino's Jackie Brown and Curdled, the Academy Award-nominated documentary Colors Straight Up, Lifetime Television's feature-length Little Girl Lost, and the entire run of the Showtime series Resurrection Blvd. His work in the documentary world includes composing soundtracks for the Emmy Award-winning Made in L.A., as well as other award-winning documentaries, including Angels in the Dust, Steal a Pencil for Me, and Cowboy del Amor.

Misa Azteca
In 1997, as part of the Meet the Composer program, González was commissioned to write his Misa Azteca, which debuted on Dec. 4, 1997, at the Tijuana Cultural Center (Centro Cultural de Tijuana) performed by the Orquesta de Baja California, the Southwestern College Choir of Chula Vista, California, and Tribu, a four-piece pre-Columbian percussion ensemble from Mexico City. On July 9, 2006, the Gloria from Misa Azteca was performed in the Concert Hall of the Sydney Opera House in Sydney, Australia. On June 18, 2009, the Sanctus from Misa Azteca was performed in Paris, France, at the Basilica of St. Denis, performed by the Hispanic Choir of the Cathedral of Our Lady of the Angels from Los Angeles, California, conducted by Antonio Espinal.  Misa Azteca was also performed at the Sorbonne and the American Cathedral in Paris (Episcopal). Selections of Misa Azteca were subsequently performed at Carnegie Hall in New York City on Feb. 20, 2011. Members of the L.A. Philharmonic performed Misa Azteca June 19, 2011, at Walt Disney Concert Hall.  Misa Azteca was scheduled to be again performed as part of the Festival of the Aegean on July 10 and 11, 2013, on the island of Syros, Greece.

Misa Azteca is a musical composition which combines Spanish and Latin texts of the Roman Catholic liturgy with songs from the Cantares Mexicanos, the largest collection of pre-Columbian Nahuatl songs or poems to have been recorded. González was influenced by Johann Sebastian Bach's Mass in B Minor, and in the manner of Stravinsky and Orff sought to create a "similar [blend] of old and new," giving the piece "a neo-Baroque flavor."

Films

Television

Short films and other works

References

External links
 

American film score composers
American male film score composers
American television composers
Living people
University of California, Los Angeles alumni
Year of birth missing (living people)